Thordur Einarsson (June 19, 1923 – May 12, 1987) was an Icelandic Ambassador.

Career 
From 1944 to 1950 he was employed from "Eggert Kristjánsson Ltd" and a Bridge Construction Company.
From 1951 to 1963 he was employed as a representative of the US embassy.
From 1964 to 1968 he was employed by the Ministry of Education.
In 1972 he entered the foreign service and represented Iceland at the Council of Europe in Strasbourg.
From 1973 to 1977 he was spokesperson of the foreign ministry.
From 1978 to 1985 he was Chief of Protocol. 
In 1986 he was Minister Counsellor Deputy Permanent Representative to the United Nations.
From  to  he was ambassador in Stockholm, from 30 October 1987 to 8 March 1991 concurrently accredited in Hellsinki and from 4 February 1988 to 1 February 1991 concurrently accredited in Belgrade and Tirana.

External links 

1923 births
1997 deaths
Thordur Einarsson
Thordur Einarsson